The All India Women's Conference (AIWC) is a non-governmental organisation (NGO) based in Delhi. It was founded in 1927 by Margaret Cousins in order to improve educational efforts for women and children and has expanded its scope to also tackle other women's rights issues. The organisation is one of the oldest women's groups in India and has branches throughout the country.

History 
The All India Women's Conference (AIWC) was founded in 1927 in Pune in order to promote women and children's education and social welfare. Margaret Cousins had called for the creation of an organisation as early as late 1925 by writing to other women's groups and to friends to come together to discuss education for women. The first meeting held in Poona saw 2,000 attendees who met at the Fergusson College Hall on Poona University. Most of the attendees were observers, but others were women that Cousins had brought together to help create the AIWC. Amrit Kaur was one of the founding members of AIWC. One of the first secretaries of AIWC was Kamaladevi Chattopadhyay.

Beginning in 1928, AIWC began to raise money to open the Lady Irwin College of Domestic Science. Also in 1928, the AIWC recognized that women's education couldn't be addressed properly without dealing with "harmful social customs." Women of the AIWC set up a committee to "watch and report on the progress of the Child Marriage Bill," and to also lobby politicians relating to the practice of child marriage. Other issues that were tackled included giving women the right to divorce, to inherit and to vote.

AIWC was registered in 1930 under the section XXI of Societies Registration Act, 1860. (No. 558 of 1930). AIWC created a journal, Roshni, in 1941 which was published in both English and Hindi. The organisation was involved in lobbying Parliament to pass new laws to protect women in India and also to help expand voting rights. A central office for AIWC was set up in 1946. Also in 1946, a "Skippo Committee" was set up to help provide villages with medical treatment. When India was fighting for independence, many more radical members left the organisation in order to become "nationalist agitators." The organisation also expelled members who were associated with Communist groups in 1948.

Activities and programmes
One of the initial main objectives of the AIWC was education of women, and it remains a primary concern today. The organisation's literacy campaign was intensified in 1996 by initiating non-formal education programmes for school drop outs and literacy programmes for adult woman with craft training through its branches. AIWC also operates microcredit schemes and energy development for rural women. AIWC has trained women in the use of solar driers for hygienically storing food. They also help women find employment, are involved in health issues and the prevention of human trafficking.

Past presidents
This is a list of the past presidents of AIWC:
 
 Maharani Chimnabai, 1927
 Jahan Begum of Bhopal, 1928	 	
 Dowager Rani of Mandi, 1929	 	
 Sarojini Naidu, 1930	 	
 Dr. Muthulakshmi Reddy, 1931	 	
 Sarala Roy, 1932	 	
 Lady Vidyagauri Nilkanth, 1933	 	
 Lady Abdul Quadir, 1934
 Hilla Rustomji Faridoonji 1935	 	
 Maharani Sethu Parvathi Bayi, 1936	 	
 Margaret E. Cousins, 1937	 	
 Amrit Kaur, 1938	 	
 Rani Lakshmibai Rajwade, 1939	 	
 Shareefa Hamid Ali, 1940–41	 	
 Rameshwari Nehru, 1942	 	
 Vijayalakshmi Pandit, 1943
 Kamladevi Chattopadhyay, 1944–45
 Hansa Mehta, 1946
 Dhanvanthi Rama Rau, 1947	 	
 Anasuyabai Kale, 1948	 	
 Urmila Mehta, 1949–50	 	
 Hannah Sen, 1951–52	 	
 Renuka Ray, 1953–54	 	
 Lakshmi N. Menon, 1955–58
 Raksha Saran, 1959–60	 	
 Mithan Jamshed Lam, 1961–62	 	
 Masuma Begum, 1963–64	 	
 M.S.H.Jhabwala 1965–68	 	
 B. Tarabai, 1969–70	 	
 Lakshmi Raguramaiah, 1971–79	 	
 Sarojini Varadappan, 1981–85	 	
 Ashoka Gupta, 1986–90
 Shobhana Ranade, 1991–95	 	
 Kunti Paul, 1996–98	 	
 Kalavati Tripathi, 1999–2001	 	
 Aparna Basu, 2002–2004	 	
 Manorma Bawa, 2005–2007	 	
 Gomathi Nair, 2008–2010	 	
 Bina Jain, 2011–2013
 Veena Kohli, 2014–2016
 Rakesh Dhawan, 2016–2020
 Sheela Kakde, 2020–present

Other members
Kitty Shiva Rao

See also
List of women's rights organisations

References

Citations

Sources

External links 
 AIWC Official Website

1927 establishments in India
Liberal feminist organizations
Women's organisations based in India
Organisations based in Delhi
Organizations established in 1927
Women's conferences
1927 in women's history